Chamseddine Dhaouadi is a Tunisian football player who plays for the Tunisia national football team.

References

Living people
1987 births
Tunisian footballers
Tunisian expatriate footballers
Tunisia international footballers
2017 Africa Cup of Nations players
Association football defenders
CS Hammam-Lif players
Étoile Sportive du Sahel players
Espérance Sportive de Tunis players
Al-Shamal SC players
Tunisian Ligue Professionnelle 1 players
Qatari Second Division players
Expatriate footballers in Qatar
Tunisian expatriate sportspeople in Qatar
2013 Africa Cup of Nations players